The Hotel Lindo, at 116 W. Liberty St. in Covington, Tennessee, was built in 1901.  It was listed on the National Register of Historic Places in 1982.

It is unusual for having two projecting corner towers, one circular and Romanesque in style, and one rectangular. The circular one was formerly topped with a domed roof; the rectangular one was topped with a hipped roof; these were both removed in 1970.

The interesting roofs can be seen in historic postcard image.

The Tipton County Courthouse is across the street and down, within view.

References

External links
Hotel Lindo, photo at Flickr

Covington, Tennessee
Hotels in Kentucky
National Register of Historic Places in Tipton County, Tennessee
Buildings and structures completed in 1901
Italianate architecture in Kentucky